Valley City is an unincorporated community in central Liverpool Township, Medina County, Ohio, United States. The west branch of the Rocky River and Plum Creek flow near Valley City from south to north.

It is located at intersection of State Routes 252 and 303 in the northwest corner of Medina County.  Settled in 1810, the surrounding township was established in 1816.  Together with Litchfield and York Townships, Liverpool Township composes the Buckeye Local School District. Valley City is part of Ohio District 7 in the U.S. House of Representatives.

Demographics

Arts and culture
Valley City is known for being "The Frog Jump Capital of Ohio."  Since 1962, it has held an annual contest patterned after Mark Twain's story, "The Celebrated Jumping Frog of Calaveras County."  On April 2, 1964, two years after the first contest was held, Governor Jim Rhodes proclaimed this contest the official state frog jumping championship.  In 1969, a few Valley City champion frogs competed in the larger contest in Calaveras County, California, including one belonging to Governor Rhodes.  Today, the contest is held at the Mill Stream Park in early August. The contest drew record breaking crowds in 2021 with over 750 frogs jumped and 4,000 attendees.

An annual street fair is held on the last weekend of August to support the local fire department.

History
In 1810, Seba Bronson, Jr., a Revolutionary War Veteran, arrives in the "Hardscrabble" area of Liverpool Township (corner of Columbia Rd and Grafton Rd.). As a so-called "squatter", Bronson occupies the land, plants corn, builds a dwelling, and establishes a thriving salt works.

See also
Liverpool Township, Medina County, Ohio
List of Ohio townships

References

External links
Liverpool Township
Valley City Community Group

Unincorporated communities in Medina County, Ohio
Unincorporated communities in Ohio
Populated places established in 1810
1810 establishments in Ohio
Cleveland metropolitan area